Ian Williams may refer to:

Ian Williams (American football) (born 1989), Notre Dame nose tackle
Ian Williams (fencer) (born 1967), British fencing coach
Ian Williams (footballer, born 1942), Australian rules footballer for Geelong
Ian Williams (footballer, born 1957), Australian rules footballer for Swan Districts and Footscray
Ian Williams (musician) (born 1970), American guitarist
 Ian Williams (rugby union) (born 1963), Australian rugby union player
Ian Williams (sailor) (born 1977), British sailor
Ian Williams (speedway rider) (born 1931), Welsh speedway rider
Ian Williams (tennis) (born 1971), American tennis player
Ian Williams (writer), Canadian poet and fiction writer